Fabrice Martin was the defending champion, but was defeated by Simone Bolelli 6–3, 6–2 in the final.

Seeds

Draw

Finals

Top half

Bottom half

References
 Main Draw
 Qualifying Draw

Guzzini Challenger - Singles
2012 Singles